NHL 2012 may refer to:
2011–12 NHL season
2012–13 NHL season
NHL 12, video game
2012 National Hurling League